In Greek mythology, Myrtoessa (Ancient Greek: Μυρτωέσσης) was an Arcadian nymph, specifically a Crinaeae, who together with other nymphs, Neda, Anthracia, Hagno and Anchirhoe, were nurses of the god Zeus. She was depicted to carry water-pots with what is meant to be water coming down from her.

Notes

References 

 Pausanias, Description of Greece with an English Translation by W.H.S. Jones, Litt.D., and H.A. Ormerod, M.A., in 4 Volumes. Cambridge, MA, Harvard University Press; London, William Heinemann Ltd. 1918. . Online version at the Perseus Digital Library
 Pausanias, Graeciae Descriptio. 3 vols. Leipzig, Teubner. 1903.  Greek text available at the Perseus Digital Library.

Arcadian mythology
Nymphs